The eSourcing Capability Model for Client Organizations (eSCM-CL) is a capability model intended for those organizations that procure or source IT-enabled services, with two objectives: (1) to provide guidance to client organizations to help them improve their capabilities throughout the lifecycle of the supply, and (2) to provide client organizations with objective means of assessing their sourcing capabilities, delegate one or more of their information technology intensive business activities to a service provider, or to those who wish to assess their sourcing capabilities. It enables client organizations to appraise and improve their capability in fostering the development of more effective relationships, manage these relationships better, and experience less failures in their client-service provider relationship.

Dimensions
The model is organized in three dimensions:

 Sourcing Life-Cycle
 Capability Area
 Capability Level

Life-cycle phases
The eSCM-CL model extends the eSCM-SP structure by adding another phase called "Analysis". So it includes ongoing practices together with practices in each of these phases of the sourcing life-cycle: Analysis, Initiation, Delivery and Completion.

Capability levels
The eSCM-CL is organized as five capability levels:

 Performing Sourcing
 Consistently Managing Sourcing
 Managing Organizational Sourcing Performance
 Proactively Enhancing Value
 Sustaining Excellence

Capability areas
The eSCM-CL contains 95 practices grouped into 17 groups, described as capability areas:

Ongoing
Sourcing Strategy Management
Government Management
Relationship Management
Value Management
Organizational Change Management
People Management
Knowledge Management
Technology Management
Threat Management
Analysis
Sourcing Opportunity Analysis
Sourcing Approach
Initiation
Sourcing Planning
Service Provider Evaluation
Sourcing Agreements
Service Transfer
Delivery
Sourced Services Management
Completion
Sourcing Completion

See also 

 eSCM (eSourcing Capability Model)
 Capability Maturity Model

References

External links 
 Hefley, B. & Loesche, E. (2009). eSourcing Capability Model for Client Organizations (eSCM-CL)  Zaltbommel, NL. VanHaren Publishing.
 Frequently Asked Questions (FAQ) about eSCM model - Spanish/Español

Information technology management